Jesse Stone (August 23, 1836May 11, 1902) was an English American immigrant, businessman, and Republican politician. He was the 18th lieutenant governor of Wisconsin, serving from January 1899 until his death.  Earlier, he served three terms in the Wisconsin State Assembly, representing eastern Jefferson County.

Early life
Stone was born in Lincoln, England, on August 23, 1836. As a young child he emigrated with his family to Waterford, New York, in 1841. He attended the common schools and became a manufacturer in the firm of Woodward and Stone as well as a stockholder in several corporations including the Wisconsin Telephone Company.

Political career
Stone moved to Louisville, Kentucky, in 1855, and then to Watertown, Wisconsin, on August 1, 1869. He served as a  Republican member of the Wisconsin State Assembly in 1880, 1882, and 1897.  Stone was also a member of the Watertown School Board and was a delegate to the Republican National Conventions in 1888 and 1892, and a member of the central committee from 1888 to 1894.

Stone was elected Lieutenant Governor of Wisconsin in 1898 and was re-elected in 1900, serving from January 2, 1899, until his death on May 11, 1902.  He died in Watertown and is interred at Oak Hill Cemetery in Watertown.

Family life
Stone married Sarah Welch in 1854 and they had a son, William C. Stone. Stone's former home in Watertown is located in what is now the South Washington Street Historic District.

References

External links
 
 The Jesse Stone House

1836 births
1902 deaths
Republican Party members of the Wisconsin State Assembly
Lieutenant Governors of Wisconsin
People from Lincoln, England
English emigrants to the United States
Politicians from Watertown, Wisconsin
Burials in Wisconsin
19th-century American politicians